Call to Danger was broadcast as a New CBS Tuesday Night Movie television film on February 27, 1973.  Initially ordered as a pilot, titled Deadly Target, the series was envisioned as a vehicle for Peter Graves should his current series, Mission: Impossible, not be renewed.  Diana Muldaur was cast as the female lead.  Parts of the movie were filmed on location in Washington, D.C.

Plot synopsis
The bold kidnapping of a crime syndicate turncoat (Roy Jenson), while in the midst of giving testimony before a Federal investigating committee, calls for an equally bold move by Justice Department investigators Inspector Douglas Warfield (Peter Graves) and Carrie Donovan (Diana Muldaur).  With the help of chief ally Emmitt Jergens (Clu Gulager), an expert beekeeper/archer/computer science wizard and private citizen, the team attempts to infiltrate the syndicate boss's hideaway—a heavily fortified and intricate farm enclave on the west coast.  Even with additional support from a gangsters fashion-model gal pal (Tina Louise) and a Justice Dept. cohort (John Anderson), Douglas and Carrie cannot ignore the increasing and likely deadly call to danger.

Cast
 Peter Graves as Inspector Douglas Warfield
 Diana Muldaur as Inspector Carrie Donovan
 Stephen McNally as Joe Barker
 John Anderson as Edward McClure
 Tina Louise as April Tierney
 Clu Gulager as Emmitt Jergens
 William Jordan as Tony Boyd
 Michael Ansara as Frank Mulvey
 Roy Jenson as Dave Falk
Victor Campos as Danny
 Ina Balin as Marla Hayes
 Paul Mantee as Simmy Adams

A perpetual pilot
Call to Danger was originally a television pilot in 1961 starring Larry Blyden that was shown on General Electric Theater.  In 1966 Peter Graves made another television pilot with the same title.  The series wasn't picked up but Graves replaced Steven Hill on the Mission Impossible television series.

Notes

External links

Television films as pilots
Television pilots not picked up as a series
1973 television films
1973 films
1973 in American television
Films directed by Tom Gries
Films scored by Laurence Rosenthal
American television films